William Franklin Skiff (October 16, 1895 – December 25, 1976) was an American professional baseball player, manager and scout.  Although he appeared only briefly in Major League Baseball in 22 total games as a catcher and pinch hitter for the   Pittsburgh Pirates and the  New York Yankees, he had a long career in the minor leagues: 19 seasons as a player or player-manager, and another 14 as a manager.

During his two big-league stints, he  hit .250 in 56 at bats. His 14 hits included two doubles. His minor league career extended from 1916–31 and 1933–51. As a manager he piloted the top-level Seattle Rainiers, Newark Bears and Kansas City Blues. He served the Yankees' organization for many years as a minor league skipper and scout.

Skiff died at age 81 in Bronxville, New York.

External links

1895 births
1976 deaths
Baseball players from New York (state)
Binghamton Triplets managers
Bridgeport Americans players
Durham Bulls managers
Durham Bulls players
Hartford Senators players
Kansas City Blues (baseball) managers
Kansas City Blues (baseball) players
Los Angeles Angels (minor league) players
Major League Baseball catchers
Milwaukee Brewers (minor league) players
Newark Bears (IL) players
New Haven Bulldogs players
New York Yankees players
New York Yankees scouts
Norfolk Tars players
Pittsburgh Pirates players
Sportspeople from New Rochelle, New York
Toronto Maple Leafs (International League) players